The 1941 Cork Senior Hurling Championship was the 53rd staging of the Cork Senior Hurling Championship since its establishment by the Cork County Board in 1887. The draw for the opening round fixtures took place at the Cork Convention on 26 January 1941. The championship began on 6 April 1941 and ended on 12 October 1941.

Glen Rovers entered the championship as the defending champions.

The final was played on 12 October 1941 at the Athletic Grounds in Cork, between Glen Rovers and Ballincollig, in what was their first ever meeting in the final. Glen Rovers won the match by 4-07 to 2-02 to claim their eighth championship title overall and an eighth title in succession.

Results

First round

Second round

Ballincollig and Blackrock received byes in this round.

Semi-finals

Final

Championship statistics

Miscellaneous

 Glen Rovers win a record eighth title in a row.
 Ballincollig qualified for the final for the first time in the club's history.
 Christy Ring won the first of his record fourteen county titles.

References

Cork Senior Hurling Championship
Cork Senior Hurling Championship